Tyler Linderbaum (born April 7, 2000) is an American football center for the Baltimore Ravens of the National Football League (NFL). He played college football at Iowa and was selected in the first round of the 2022 NFL Draft.

Early years
Linderbaum was born on April 7, 2000, in Solon, Iowa and is of German descent. He later attended Solon High School, where he played both offensive and defensive line. Linderbaum played in the 2018 U.S. Army All-American Game. He committed to the University of Iowa to play college football.

College career
Linderbaum began his career at Iowa as a defensive lineman before moving to center prior to the 2019 season. He started all 13 games that season. He returned as the starter in 2020 and was named an All-American as well as a finalist for the Rimington Trophy. In 2021, was named the Rimington–Pace Offensive Lineman of the Year and won the Rimington Trophy while being named to a unanimous All-American.

Professional career

Linderbaum was drafted by the Baltimore Ravens in the first round 25th with the overall pick after a trade with the Arizona Cardinals to get the draft pick in the 2022 NFL Draft. Linderbaum started all 17 regular season games and one playoff game for the Ravens in his rookie season. He earned a spot on the PFWA All-Rookie Team.

References

External links
 Baltimore Ravens bio
Iowa Hawkeyes bio

2000 births
Living people
People from Solon, Iowa
Players of American football from Iowa
American football centers
American football defensive linemen
Iowa Hawkeyes football players
All-American college football players
Baltimore Ravens players